The Beard Congregational Church, at 402 Granger St. in Erath, Louisiana was listed on the National Register of Historic Places in 2015.

It is a simple frame country church built in 1916.  It also served as a school for African American children.

References

Schools in Vermilion Parish, Louisiana
Congregational churches in Louisiana
African-American historic places
National Register of Historic Places in Vermilion Parish, Louisiana
Churches completed in 1916
Churches on the National Register of Historic Places in Louisiana
1916 establishments in Louisiana
School buildings on the National Register of Historic Places in Louisiana